Countess Valentine de Riquet de Caraman (15 February 1839 - 25 August 1914) was a Belgian princess. She was the daughter of Joseph de Riquet de Caraman-Chimay (1808-1886) and Émilie Pellapra. Her first marriage was to prince Paul de Bauffremont on 13 April 1861, but this ended in divorce in 1875 - she gained custody of her two children and later the same year married Georges Bibescu, son of Gheorghe Bibescu, with whom she had three more children - Georges, Nadège (princess Stirbey) and Georges-Valentin (1880-1941).

Sources
http://viaf.org/viaf/66457978
https://gw.geneanet.org/samlap?lang=fr&n=de+riquet+de+caraman+chimay&oc=0&p=valentine

1839 births
1914 deaths
Belgian nobility